The 1924 Duke Blue Devils football team was an American football team that represented Duke University as an independent during the 1924 college football season. In its first and only season under head coach Howard Jones, the team compiled a 4–5 record and outscored opponents by a total of 129 to 99. Jones was later inducted into the College Football Hall of Fame.

Schedule

References

Duke
Duke Blue Devils football seasons
Duke Blue Devils football